Mathilde Nielsen (26 October 1858 – 11 September 1945) was a Danish actress in the theatre and in Danish cinema. She was known as a figure of matriarchy in Danish film.

Selected filmography
Hævnens nat 1916
Prästänkan 1920
Lykkens galoscher 1921
 David Copperfield 1922
Paa slaget 12 1924
Lille Dorrit 1924
Det store hjerte 1925
Du skal ære din hustru 1925
Det sovende hus 1926
 The Clown 1926
Lykkehjulet 1927
Den sørgmuntre barber 1927
The Vicar of Vejlby 1931
Kirke og orgel 1932
Skal vi vædde en million? 1932
De blaa drenge 1933
Nyhavn 17 1933
7-9-13 1934
Ud i den kolde sne 1934
Millionærdrengen 1936
Kongen bød 1938
Skilsmissens børn 1939
Sommerglæder 1940
Tante Cramers testamente 1941
Tobiasnætter 1941
Tror du jeg er født i går? 1941
Tyrannens fald 1942

External links
Danish Film Institute

1858 births
1945 deaths
Danish stage actresses
Danish film actresses
Danish silent film actresses
20th-century Danish actresses
Actresses from Copenhagen